Valuyevo is a rural locality (a selo) in Preobrazhensky Selsoviet of Zavitinsky District, Amur Oblast, Russia. The population was 112 as of 2018. There are 2 streets.

Geography 
Valuyevo is located near the Trans-Siberian Railway, 18 km southeast of Zavitinsk (the district's administrative centre) by road. Deya is the nearest rural locality.

References 

Rural localities in Zavitinsky District